Orthocomotis chlamyda is a species of moth of the family Tortricidae. It is found in Venezuela.

The wingspan is 22 mm. The ground colour of the forewings is cream, tinged with ochreous and sprinkled and dotted with brown. The markings are brown. The hindwings are brownish.

Etymology
The species name refers to the colouration of the species and is derived from Greek chlamys (meaning men's overcoat).

References

Moths described in 2006
Orthocomotis